The 1900 Texas Longhorns football team represented the University of Texas at Austin in the 1900 college football season. In their first year under head coach Samuel Huston Thompson, the Longhorns compiled an undefeated 6–0 and outscored opponents by a collective total of 113 to 13.

Schedule

References

Texas
Texas Longhorns football seasons
College football undefeated seasons
Texas Longhorns football